Johannes Arnoldi Corvinus born Joannes Arnoldsz Ravens (c.1582, Leiden – 2 January 1650, Amsterdam) was a Dutch Remonstrant minister and jurist.

Life
He was born in Leiden, and in 1606 was a Calvinist preacher there. A pupil of Jacobus Arminius, he took up the Arminian views, he was a public supporter of them by 1609, and in 1610 signed the Five Articles of Remonstrance. Subsequently, as a consequence of the Synod of Dort, he lost his church office in 1619. He left the country, being abroad until 1630. Studying law, he then had a career as advocate in Amsterdam. In 1629 he converted to Roman Catholicism.

Works
Theological writings
Christelicke ende ernstighe vermaninghe tot vrede aen R. Donteclock (1609), against Reinier Donteclock 
Teghen-bericht jeghens D. Francisci Gomari (1610), against Franciscus Gomarus
Responsio ad Bogermanni adnotationes, pro Grotio (1613), reply to Johannes Bogermann
Censura anatomes Arminianismi etc. (1614), against Pierre du Moulin 
Petri Molinaei novi anatomici mala encheiresis (1622). Reply to Du Moulin's Anatome Arminianismi (1619). This work follows Hugo Grotius on the Ten Commandments, suggesting they are divine positive law, rather than the law of nature.

Legal writings
Corvinus had been quite close to Grotius, in the 1610s, and from around 1632 taught the law. With Gerard de Wassenaer and Pieter de la Court he was one of a group of legal writers with Remonstrant sympathies who commented on reason of state; Corvinus did this in an edition of the De arcanis rerumpublicarum of Arnoldus Clapmarius (1641). Other works were:
Posthumus Pacianus (1643) on Giulio Pace
Jurisprudentia romana (1644)
Conclusiones de ivre pvblico (1644) with Arnoldus Clapmarius, Christoph Besold, and Franciscus Rosellus
Enchiridium seu institutiones imperiales (1649)
Jus canonicum per aphorismos strictim explicatum (1648)

Family
His son Arendt became a professor of law at Mainz.

Notes

External links
 

 www.biografischportaal.nl

1580s births
1650 deaths
Remonstrants
Arminian writers
Arminian theologians
Dutch jurists
Leiden University alumni
People from Leiden